Norape miasma is a moth of the Megalopygidae family. It was described by Harrison Gray Dyar Jr. in 1910.

References

Moths described in 1910
Megalopygidae